Dinophysaceae is a family of dinoflagellates in the class Dinophyceae.

Genera 
According to the World Register of Marine Species, the following species are accepted within:

 Citharistes Stein
 Dinoceras Schiller
 Dinofurcula Kofoid & Skogsberg
 Dinophysis Ehrenberg
 Heteroschisma Kofoid & Skogsberg
 Histioneis Stein
 Ichthyodinium Hollande & J.Cachon
 Metaphalacroma Tai & Skogsberg
 Ornithocercus Stein
 Sinophysis Nie & C.Wang
 Thaumatodinium A.Böhm

References 

Syndiniophyceae